Christmas Comes But Once a Year is a 1936 animated short produced by Fleischer Studios and released on December 4, 1936 by Paramount Pictures. It is part of the Color Classics series. The cartoon features Professor Grampy, a character from the Betty Boop series; this is the character's only appearance without Betty. The cartoon was restored from the original Paramount Pictures camera negatives by Jane Fleischer Reid’s company Fabulous Fleischer Cartoons Restored and debuted on MeTV’s Toon in With Me on December 21, 2022.

Summary
The cartoon begins in an orphanage, where the orphans are all asleep in the dormitory, waiting for Christmas morning. Just then the clock chimes, and a puppy in the place of the cuckoo jumps out, slides down a ramp, and licks one of the orphans. The first orphan wakes up to shout to the others, "Merry Christmas, everybody!" They all jump out of bed and make their way to the hall, where they grab the toys from their stockings and get ready to play with them. However, they discover the terrible truth that the toys are old, worn, and already broken when they completely fall apart. The orphans are traumatized, and they burst into tears over having no other Christmas presents.

Meanwhile, Professor Grampy is outside, riding through the snow in his outboard motor-driven sleigh. He hears crying as he passes the orphanage, so he parks the sleigh, runs to the door, and peeps through the window to see the orphans wailing and tearfully heading back to their bedroom. Grampy feels concerned and worried for the orphans and starts to think of a way to give them a better Christmas. He puts on his "thinking cap", and the lightbulb on his cap blinks, meaning that he has an idea. He sneaks in through the kitchen window and starts making new toys out of household appliances, furniture, and other kitchen paraphernalia (a washboard, a roller shade, the works of an old alarm clock, etc).

While the orphans are still crying in the dormitory, Grampy dresses up as Santa Claus (with bent stovepipes for the boots, a red tablecloth for the jacket, a pillow for the weight, a strop for the belt, a picture frame for the buckle, and a red purse for the hat), grabs a dinner bell, and surprises the orphans by ringing the bell and shouting, "Merry Christmas, everybody!" The orphans instantly stop crying, brighten and excitedly rush out to play with their new toys, and also sled and ski down what was their staircase, now turned into a makeshift winter wonderland.

Grampy completes the scene by making a Christmas tree out of green umbrellas. He places it on top of a phonograph, decorates it, and gathers all the orphans together. As they sing, a giant 1936 Christmas Seal stamp appears on the screen, showing Santa Claus and a "Holiday Greetings" message.

Production
The orphans were all animated based on a template of one of them, whose toy soldier falls through the sock. The short was directed by Dave Fleischer and starred actor Everett Clark as the voice of Grampy; it was Grampy's only appearance in which Betty Boop did not appear.

Along with many of the other Color Classics, Christmas Comes But Once a Year is today in the public domain. On various video copies of the film, it is released with Hector's Hectic Life, and a few other productions by Famous Studios, including Snow Foolin'''. Certain prints also contain Jack Frost, a 1934 cartoon produced by Ub Iwerks and released through Celebrity Productions.

The film's title song would be slightly rewritten the following year for the New Years-themed Popeye the Sailor cartoon "Let's Celebrake" where it was sung by Popeye and Bluto at the beginning.

Lyrics
Christmas comes but once a year 
Now it's here, now it's here 
Bringing lots of joy and cheer 
Tra la la la la

You and me and he and she 
And we are glad because 
Why? Because, because, because 
There is a Santa Claus

Oh, Christmas comes but once a year 
Now it's here, now it's here 
Bringing lots of joy and cheer 
Tra la la la la

See also
 List of Christmas films

References

External links
 
 Christmas Comes But Once a Year'' at the TCM Movie Database
 

1936 films
Color Classics cartoons
American Christmas films
Fleischer Studios short films
1930s color films
1930s American animated films
1930s Christmas films
Articles containing video clips
1936 animated films
Paramount Pictures short films
Short films directed by Dave Fleischer
1930s English-language films